Hector and the Search for Happiness is a novel by French writer François Lelord written in 2002 and translated into English in 2010. It has sold over two million copies.

A film adaptation, directed by Peter Chelsom, with Simon Pegg and Rosamund Pike starring, was released on 15 August 2014.

Reception
Emma Hagestadt in The Independent wrote "Served up as a series of philosophical bonne bouches, Hector's lessons for life may verge on the banale -- make sure to be good to your friends, be loved for who you are, take holidays in the sun -- but their effect is unexpectedly cheering."

References 

2002 French novels
French novels adapted into films
French philosophical novels
2002 debut novels